The 1907 Army Cadets football team represented the United States Military Academy in the 1907 college football season. In their second season (first full season) under head coach Henry Smither, the Cadets compiled a  record, shut out six of their nine opponents, and outscored all opponents by a combined total of 125 to 24.  The team's only two losses were to Cornell and to Navy in the annual Army–Navy Game. 
 
Two Army players were honored by either Walter Camp (WC) or Caspar Whitney (CW) on the All-America team. They are guard William Erwin (WC-1, CW-1) and tackle Henry Weeks (WC-3, CW-2).

Schedule

References

Army
Army Black Knights football seasons
Army